Draculoides bramstokeri is a small, troglobite, Australian arachnid. Often mistaken for a spider, D. bramstokeri is a schizomid — a small, soil-dwelling invertebrate that walks on six legs and uses two modified front legs as feelers. It uses large fang-like pedipalps, or pincers, to grasp invertebrate prey and crunch it into pieces before sucking out the juices. Named for this method of dispatching victims and after Bram Stoker, the author of Dracula.

The species is light yellow or brown, 5 mm long and known to inhabit six caves on Barrow Island and two on the North West Cape in Western Australia. It is threatened by pollution and damage to caves and is vulnerable to extinction. Draculoides bramstokeri was first described in 1995.

The other three described species of Draculoides also occur in Australia.

See also
Threatened fauna of Australia
List of organisms named after famous people (born 1800–1899)

References 

 
 

Arachnids of Australia
Arthropods of Western Australia
Animals described in 1995
Bram Stoker
Schizomida
Cave arachnids
Dracula
Endemic fauna of Australia